Charlemont High School may refer to:

In the USA
Hawlemont Regional Elementary School, Charlemont, Massachusetts

Elsewhere
Charlemont High School, Jamaica